Go Joon-hee (born Kim Eun-joo on August 31, 1985) is a South Korean actress. She made her entertainment debut as a school uniform model in 2001, then launched an acting career in 2003.

Background
Kim adopted the stage name Go Joon-hee in 2008, after her character's name in What's Up Fox (2006).

Career
After playing supporting roles in Girl Scout (2008) and Architecture 101 (2012), she was cast as a lead actress in the 2011 indies Drifting Away and Yeosu, the mainstream romantic comedies Marriage Blue (2013) and Red Carpet (2014), and the heist film Intimate Enemies (2015).

Go has also appeared in several television dramas, notably Listen to My Heart (2011), The Chaser (2012), and Queen of Ambition (2013). In 2013, she joined the fourth season of dating reality show We Got Married opposite Jinwoon of boyband 2AM.

In 2015, Go starred in the hit romantic comedy series She Was Pretty.

In February 2017, Go signed with YG Entertainment. The same year, she starred in action melodrama Untouchable.

In 2019, Go starred in OCN's supernatural thriller Possessed.

In June 2019, Go signed with new agency C-JeS Entertainment.

In March 2022, Go did not renew her contract with GLO Entertainment. Later In May, Go signed a contract with Y-Bloom.

Filmography

Film

Television series

Variety show

Music video

Awards and nominations

References

External links
 
 
 

Actresses from Seoul
South Korean film actresses
South Korean television actresses
South Korean female models
1985 births
Living people
Models from Seoul